Oualid El Hajjam (born 19 February 1991) is a professional footballer who plays as a defender for  club Le Havre. Born in France, he represents Morocco at international level.

Club career
On 15 July 2022, El Hajjam signed a two-year contract with Le Havre.

International career
El Hajjam made his senior debut for the Morocco national football team in a 2–0 friendly win over Uzbekistan on 27 March 2018.

Career statistics

References

External links
 
 
 

1991 births
Living people
People from Châteauroux
Sportspeople from Indre
Moroccan footballers
Morocco international footballers
French footballers
French sportspeople of Moroccan descent
Association football defenders
Le Mans FC players
Amiens SC players
ES Troyes AC players
Le Havre AC players
Ligue 1 players
Ligue 2 players
Championnat National players
Footballers from Centre-Val de Loire